The 1979–80 Balkans Cup was an edition of the Balkans Cup, a football competition for representative clubs from the Balkan states. It was contested by 5 teams and Sportul Studențesc won the trophy.

Group A

Group B

Finals

First leg

Second leg

Sportul Studențesc won 3–1 on aggregate.

References

External links 

 RSSSF Archive → Balkans Cup
 
 Mehmet Çelik. "Balkan Cup". Turkish Soccer

1979
1978–79 in European football
1979–80 in European football
1978–79 in Romanian football
1979–80 in Romanian football
1978–79 in Greek football
1979–80 in Greek football
1978–79 in Bulgarian football
1979–80 in Bulgarian football
1978–79 in Turkish football
1979–80 in Turkish football
1978–79 in Yugoslav football
1979–80 in Yugoslav football
1978–79 in Albanian football
1979–80 in Albanian football